Madge Hamilton Lyons Macbeth (November 6, 1878 – September 20, 1965) was an American-born Canadian writer.

Life and career 
The daughter of Bessie Maffit and Hymen Hart Lyons, she was born Madge Hamilton Lyons in Philadelphia. She attended Hellmuth Ladies' College in London, Ontario and worked on the school paper there. After graduation, she performed as a touring mandolinist in Maryland from 1899 to 1901.

In 1901, she married Charles William Macbeth, a Canadian civil engineer. The couple lived in Detroit and then moved to Ottawa around 1904. Her husband died of tuberculosis in 1908, leaving her with two young sons.

She began writing to support her family and published her first two stories in Canada West and the Canadian Magazine. She published The Winning Game, her first novel, in 1910. Macbeth was a founding member of the Ottawa Little Theatre. She published a column "Over My Shoulder" in the Ottawa Citizen. She also wrote advertisements, including brochures for the Canadian Pacific Railway, short stories for magazines, interviews with members of the Canadian parliament and articles on local history.

She was elected president of the Canadian Authors Association in 1939, 1940 and 1941, becoming the first women head of that organization.

Macbeth died in Ottawa at the age of 86.

Selected works
 Kleath, novel (1917)
 The Patterson Limit, novel (1923)
 The Land of Afternoon, political satire (1924), using pen name Gilbert Knox
 Shackles, novel (1926)
 The Kinder Bees, political satire (1935), writing as Gilbert Knox
 Over My Shoulder, memoir (1953)
 Boulevard Career, memoir (1957)

Notes

References

External links
 

1878 births
1965 deaths
20th-century Canadian women writers
Canadian women journalists
Canadian columnists
Canadian memoirists
Canadian women columnists
Canadian women memoirists
American emigrants to Canada